Marlene Elizabeth Smith (August 3, 1931 – March 1, 2009) was a Canadian figure skater who competed in both pairs and ladies' singles. As a pair skater with Donald Gilchrist, she became the 1949 North American silver medallist and a two-time Canadian national champion (1949–1950). As a singles skater, she is the 1949 North American silver medallist and 1952 national champion. She competed at the 1952 Winter Olympics.

Results

Ladies' singles

Pairs with Gilchrist

References

1931 births
Canadian female single skaters
Canadian female pair skaters
Figure skaters at the 1952 Winter Olympics
Olympic figure skaters of Canada
2009 deaths